The City Hall of Sighişoara, Romania is located near to Monastery Church. The building was built between 1887–1888. In the upper floor there is a baroque hall, which hosts an Academic Music festival and many other concerts of prestigious bands.

Sighișoara